Madhopur is a village inhabited mostly by scheduled castes, while Bhogpur is a town and a nagar panchayat in Jalandhar district in the state of Punjab, India.

Bhogpur is the first city in India to have its own website.

Bhogpur's sugar mill is first co-operative sugar mill and is still running.

About 
Madhopur lies on the Jalandhar-Pathankot road, which is almost 5 km from it.  The nearest railway station to Madhopur is the Bhogpur railway station, 4.5 km away.

Post code 
Madhopur's Post code is 144201.

See also 

 Balbir Madhopuri (Punjabi writer)

References

External links 
   Official website of Punjab Govt. with Madhopur's details

Villages in Jalandhar district